Lithops verruculosa is a species of plant in the family Aizoaceae, endemic to South Africa.

References

verruculosa
Endemic flora of South Africa
Plants described in 1947